1st Vitranc Cup was an alpine skiing competition, held between 4–5 March 1961 in Kranjska Gora, SR Slovenia, Yugoslavia. They were hosting two FIS 1A international events.

Official results

Giant slalom 
On 4 March 1961, giant slalom with only one run, was held as Vitranc Cup premiere event. Start was at the top of the Vitranc mountain (1,552 m) and with finish line at "Bukovnik meadow" (1,035 m).

The upper part of the course was extremely steep and dangerous, brutal demanding and also known as "hara-kiri with accelaration". That's why it was never used again and moved lower ever since.

Slalom 
On 5 March 1961, slalom was held in front of 10,000 people.

References

External links
 

International sports competitions hosted by Yugoslavia
1961 in Yugoslav sport
International sports competitions hosted by Slovenia
Alpine skiing competitions
Alpine skiing in Slovenia
1961 in Slovenia

sl:1. Pokal Vitranc (1961)